Ruby Hill is an English international indoor bowler.

Bowls career
In 2022, she won the English National Under-25 indoor title, which qualified her to represent England at the 2022 World Bowls Indoor Championships. She had previously won the 2020 National indoor triples.

References

English female bowls players
2000 births
Living people